Sibte Hasan Zaidi (15 April 1918 – 5 April 2008) was an Indian pathologist and toxicologist.  After his training in pathology at the Hammersmith Hospital in London, United Kingdom, he returned to India to continue experimental toxicology research initially at the Central Drug Research Institute, and then as Founding Director at Industrial Toxicology Research Center (ITRC) in Lucknow (1965-1978) (now renamed as Indian Institute of Toxicology Research, IITR).  During his later years, he served on national and international (mainly World Health Organization) committees to increase awareness and set policy to prevent the harmful effects of industrial toxins in people.

Early life and career 

Sibte Hasan Zaidi was born in Barabanki, India and grew up in the village town of Jarwal with his maternal uncle because of the early death of his mother, Zakia Begum.  Thereafter, he studied at Barabanki High School and lived initially with his father, Syed Hasan Zaidi, a barrister-at-law from the Inner Temple, London, who practised civil law.  Upon the death of his father in 1931, Sibte Zaidi moved in with his uncle, Sardar Husain, also a barrister from Lincoln's Inn in London.  Educated thereafter in Christian College and Lucknow University, Sibte Zaidi entered King George’s Medical College (KGMC, now King George's Medical University, Lucknow, in 1940, and graduated with a medical degree (Bachelor of Medicine and Bachelor of Surgery)  in 1945.  In 1948, he married Qamar Ara Shanshah Husain granddaughter of the Rajah of Bhatwamau, who was a clinical child psychologist (and founded the School for Mentally Disabled Children, Chetna, in Lucknow, India).  After his clinical training and a brief academic appointment in Pathology at KGMC, Sibte Zaidi left for the United Kingdom to work under the tutelage of Professor Earl J. King, the discoverer of the alkaline phosphatase unitage, the King-Armstrong Units, at the Postgraduate Medical School (later to be named the Royal Postgraduate Medical School, now Imperial College, London) and the Hammersmith Hospital in London.  During his tenure at the Hammersmith, Zaidi also trained in Clinical Pathology and was awarded a PhD (1954) and a Diploma in Clinical Pathology (1952), both from the University of London.

Research 

Around ca 1950, King had developed an interest in the health of coal miners in the Sheffield area.  Zaidi, as King’s PhD student, provided a description of the pathology and pathophysiology of coal miner’s lung.  According to J.S. Faulds, Zaidi and coworkers "produced the nearest approach to  massive fibrosis by injecting into sensitized animals dust plus tubercle bacilli", importantly, as tuberculosis was prevalent at the time.

In 1955, Zaidi travelled back to India to be named Head the Division of Experimental Medicine and then Deputy Director at Central Drug Research Institute (CDRI) in Lucknow, where his research focused on mechanisms that underlie peptic ulcer, atherosclerosis, vasospasm, and eosinophilia.  Through a complement of pharmacologic and animal studies, Zaidi and his colleagues demonstrated the requirement of a mucus barrier in the prevention of peptic ulcer disease.  For this, as noted on the Council of Scientific and Industrial Research website, he received the Sir Shanti Swaroop Bhatnagar Award for the scientific excellence (1963).  He also made contributions to understanding the process of atherosclerosis, where he not only examined the mechanisms of hypercoaguability and thrombosis, but also developed rodent models of atherosclerotic heart disease and experimental myocardial infarction.

Between 1964 and 1965, Zaidi served as the third Director of the newly founded Indian Institute of Biochemistry and Experimental Medicine in Calcutta (renamed Indian Institute of Chemical Biology), where he established the institute's research infrastructure, and initiated research on industrial toxins to dissect and clarify, at a more fundamental level, the mechanisms of pulmonary fibrosis following exposure to a wide range of toxins, including asbestos, silica, mica, wood dust, and bagasse.

Industrial Toxicology Research Center (ITRC) 

This work provided the stimulus for the emergence of a new discipline of Industrial Toxicology in India, where toxic exposure had remained an unrecognised health hazard. Zaidi became the Founding Director of the first institute in South East Asia – Industrial Toxicology Research Center (ITRC) in Lucknow (now renamed as Indian Institute of Toxicology Research, IITR). It moved from its temporary CDRI quarters to the current building, as of 2015.  The premises were visited by the then President of India, V. V. Giri, and the new buildings dedicated on 27 July 1976 by President Fakhruddin Ali Ahmed, per a "News Item" published in Clinical Toxicology, which also comments on the role of Zaidi in nurturing many areas of industrial toxicology.  Beginning as a modest sized set of laboratories with few interested scientists, ITRC witnessed growth during the late 1960s and 1970s.  There were only few other centres of excellence that were involved in research in Industrial Toxicology worldwide, including those headed by Professor Schilipkoter in Düsseldorf, Germany, and Erwing Selikoff at Mount Sinai Hospital in New York.  During his tenure at ITRC, Zaidi continued to work on cellular mechanisms through which asbestos, silica and other dusts as well as other industrial toxins affected human health (for example ).  His research was funded continuously by the Public Health Service of the United States through their PL480 scheme.

Publications 
Zaidi's monograph "Experimental Pneumoconiosis" was published by Johns Hopkins Press in 1969.  In addition, over 140 publications resulted from this work.

Recognition 
Zaidi was awarded the William P. Yant Award for lifetime achievements and contributions to industrial toxicology by the American Industrial Hygiene Association in 1977.  He also served on the Editorial Board of the American Industrial Hygiene Association (1977-1993).  The Venezuelan Society also gave him the highest honour for his contributions to industrial medicine (1978).  For his work in India, he was awarded the Sir Ardeshirlal Dalal Gold Medal for his contributions to occupational health (1975), and a national honour the Padam Shree (1977) by the Government of India. Zaidi was inducted as the Founding Member of the Royal College of Pathologists, and thereafter was conferred a Fellowship.  On the national front, he was inducted as a Fellow of the  National Academy of Medical Sciences of India (1976), the National Academy of Sciences, India (1972) and the Indian National Science Academy (1974).  These honors are listed in his official obituary published by the Indian Institute of Toxicology Research.  In recognition of his contributions to ITRC, an endowed annual lectureship, Professor SH Zaidi Memorial Oration, was established in 1998. The 12th oration was given by his son, Professor Mone Zaidi.

Policy 
In 1975, Zaidi hosted "The International Symposium on Industrial Toxicology" in Lucknow, which showcased the then cutting-edge science in the field of industrial medicine.  He was thereafter inducted as President of the Asian Society of Environmental Industrial Toxicology (1975).  He was also Professor at the Azad University in Kanpur, and Visiting Professor to the University of Düsseldorf on two occasions, where he participated in further studies on the action of toxic metals.

Zaidi served on the United Nations Development Program (UNDP), World Health Organization (WHO), and the International Labor Organization (ILO).  His work on the World Health Organization's Expert Committees became the basis of two key technical reports (Technical Report Series).  He was also Advisor to the Occupational Health Committee of the WHO, Member of the Scientific Advisory Committee of the UN International Registry on Potentially Toxic Chemicals in Geneva (1977-1979), Senior Consultant to the United Nations Environmental Program (1982), and WHO Consultant in Bangladesh and Burma.  He also established international courses on preventive toxicology under the United Nations in Switzerland, USSR, Czechoslovakia and Germany.  To promote the cause of industrial medicine, he founded two further institutes for outreach research in Rangoon (1982-1984) and Sri Lanka (1979), under the aegis of the United Nations.

In India, he served as Honorary Advisor to the Ministry of Railways, a position that he retained between 1978 and 1989.  His Editorial "Bhopal and After,"  published in the American Journal of Industrial Medicine, and later quoted in several articles, highlighted gaps in policy that could lead to spillage of chemicals of such magnitude, even in the 1980s.  He subsequently chaired the Environmental Research Committee of the Ministry of Environment of the Government of India between 1990 and 1993.

Later life 

During the late 1990s and thereafter, Zaidi lived intermittently in India, the United Kingdom and the United States with his son, Mone Zaidi, who is attending physician at Mount Sinai Hospital and Professor of Medicine and of Pharmacological Sciences, and Director of the Center of Translational Medicine and Pharmacology at Icahn School of Medicine at Mount Sinai in New York. Zaidi died at his home in Riverdale, New York, on 5 April 2008.

References

1918 births
2008 deaths
Indian pathologists
Indian toxicologists
Indian Muslims
People from Barabanki district
Medical doctors from Uttar Pradesh
Recipients of the Padma Shri in science & engineering
University of Lucknow alumni
Alumni of Imperial College London
Fellows of the Indian National Science Academy
Fellows of The National Academy of Sciences, India
Indian medical researchers
Indian medical writers
20th-century Indian medical doctors
Recipients of the Shanti Swarup Bhatnagar Award in Medical Science
Twelvers
Indian Shia Muslims